Alan Nelson is the name of:

Alan C. Nelson, former Commission of the Immigration and Naturalization Services in the United States, and co-author of California Proposition 187
Alan R. Nelson, former American Medical Association president
Alan Nelson, director of the Arizona State University Biodesign Institute 
Alan Nelson (cricketer), Irish first-class cricketer
Alan Nelson (writer), author of "Man in a Hurry" in the 1964 anthology The Unquiet Grave